Ystalyfera Rugby Football Club are a Welsh rugby union club based in Ystalyfera in south Wales. The club is a member of the Welsh Rugby Union and is also a feeder club for the Ospreys.  The club received Welsh Rugby Union status in 1904, were founder members of the West Wales League in 1929 and founder members of the National League Division 8 Central 'A' in 1994

Club honours
 West Wales Champions 1930-31
 West Wales Cup Winners 1938-39
 West Wales Section ‘C’ Champions 1976-77
 Welsh National Division 5 Central Champions 1998-99
 Swansea Valley Cup Winners 1998-99, 2011–12,2014-15
 West Wales Bowl Winners 2010-11
2013 division 3 south west winners
2017 wru plate finalist runners up
2019 silver ball Finalist 
2019 west wales finalist 
2019 division 1 west central winners
2018 west wales cup winners

Notable past players
Senior International players who have also played for Ystalyfera
  Howell Lewis (4 caps) 1913-14
  Albert Owen (1 cap)  1924
  Jack Howell John (8 caps) 1926-27
  Clive Rowlands (14 caps) 1962-65

History
 2012/13 Ystalyfera RFC season
 2011/12 Ystalyfera RFC season
 2010/11 Ystalyfera RFC season
 2009/10 Ystalyfera RFC season
 2008/09 Ystalyfera RFC season
 2007/08 Ystalyfera RFC season
 2006/07 Ystalyfera RFC season
 2005/06 Ystalyfera RFC season
 2004/05 Ystalyfera RFC season
 2003/04 Ystalyfera RFC season
 2002/03 Ystalyfera RFC season
 2001/02 Ystalyfera RFC season
 2000/01 Ystalyfera RFC season
 1999/00 Ystalyfera RFC season
 1998/99 Ystalyfera RFC season

References

Welsh rugby union teams
Rugby union in Neath Port Talbot
Rugby clubs established in 1890
1890 establishments in Wales